Hüttingen  may refer to:

Hüttingen an der Kyll, municipality in the district of Bitburg-Prüm, in Rhineland-Palatinate, western Germany
Hüttingen bei Lahr, municipality in the district of Bitburg-Prüm, in Rhineland-Palatinate, western Germany

See also
Hüttlingen (disambiguation)